Pelican is an unincorporated settlement and railway point  in the municipality of Sioux Lookout, Kenora District in northwestern Ontario, Canada. It is located just south of Pelican Lake on the English River, part of the Nelson River drainage basin.

Pelican is on the Canadian National Railway transcontinental main line, between Hudson to the west and the town centre of Sioux Lookout to the east, and is passed but not served by Via Rail transcontinental Canadian trains.

References

Communities in Kenora District